Faris Khalil (Arabic:فارس خليل) (born 8 October 2000) is an Emirati footballer. He currently plays as a left back for Al-Wasl.

Career
Faris Khalil started his career at Al-Wasl and is a product of the Al-Wasl's youth system. On 17 March 2018, Faris Khalil made his professional debut for Al-Wasl against Al Dhafra in the Pro League, replacing Hazza Salem .

References

External links
 

2000 births
Living people
Emirati footballers
Olympic footballers of the United Arab Emirates
Al-Wasl F.C. players
Emirates Club players
UAE Pro League players
Association football fullbacks
Place of birth missing (living people)